The Funky Aztecs are a hip-hop/rap group from Vallejo California formed in 1990. Original members include lead MC Merciless aka Merc100man, Sapo Loco aka Sapo aka Suga Ray and Indio aka OH Mighty Ric aka Big Ric. In 1998 Sapo Loco left the group which then added two new members the original Game aka Juego and Mainey Mo. The Aztecs are trailblazers in the hip-hop world and are considered the first Chicano Rap group. The Funky Aztecs signed with TnT Records in 1991 and produced three albums from 1992 thru 1999. Working with legendary producers and artists including Tupac, Shock-G, Money-B, Pee-Wee, Big Deon, TMD and many more.

Discography

Studio albums
 Chicano Blues (1992)
 Day of the Dead/Dia De Los Muertos (1996)
 Addicted (1999)

Solo projects
 Merciless presents – Real Tales of the Funky Aztecs (2000)
 Merciless – Step Into My World (2002)		
 Merciless – Flesh & Ink (2004)

References

American hip hop groups